An Election to the Edinburgh Corporation was held on 2 November 1897, alongside municipal elections across Scotland, and the wider British local elections. Contests took place in 5 of the cities’ 13 wards, with candidates in the remaining 8 being returned unopposed. Three Portobello wards also held elections. The election was relatively quiet, with no particularly important issues being raised. As a result, the main focus of the election was on the Lord Provost and the personalities of the individual candidates.

The Liberal Sir Mitchell Mitchell-Thomson, 1st Baronet took over as Provost following the election, replacing the Unionist Sir Andrew McDonald.

Aggregate results

Ward Results

References

1897
1897 Scottish local elections
November 1897 events